Claude Bertrand,  (March 28, 1917 – August 7, 2014) was a Canadian neurosurgeon.

Born in Sherbrooke, Quebec, he received a Bachelor of Arts in 1934 and a Doctor of Medicine from Université de Montréal in 1940. Elected a Rhodes Scholar in 1940, he went to Oxford in 1946, to work under Professor LeGros Clarke and Professor Graham Weddell.

In 1971, he was made a Companion of the Order of Canada "for his research work and his contribution to the advancement of neurosurgery".

He died on August 7, 2014. He was 97 years old.

References

1917 births
2014 deaths
Canadian Rhodes Scholars
Companions of the Order of Canada
Canadian neurosurgeons
People from Sherbrooke